Borismene is a monotypic genus of plant in the family Menispermaceae native to the Amazon Rainforest. The Plant List recognises the single species Borismene japurensis.

References

External links
Borismene japurensis
 Flora Brasiliensis: Anomospermum japurense

Menispermaceae
Menispermaceae genera
Monotypic Ranunculales genera
Flora of Brazil